Photoheterotrophs (Gk: photo = light, hetero = (an)other, troph = nourishment) are heterotrophic phototrophs – that is, they are organisms that use light for energy, but cannot use carbon dioxide as their sole carbon source. Consequently, they use organic compounds from the environment to satisfy their carbon requirements; these compounds include carbohydrates, fatty acids, and alcohols. Examples of photoheterotrophic organisms include purple non-sulfur bacteria, green non-sulfur bacteria, and heliobacteria. Recent research has indicated that the oriental hornet and some aphids may be able to use light to supplement their energy supply.

Research 
Studies have shown that mammalian mitochondria can also capture light and synthesize ATP when mixed with pheophorbide, a light-capturing metabolite of chlorophyll. Research demonstrated that the same metabolite when fed to the worm Caenorhabditis elegans leads to increase in ATP synthesis upon light exposure, along with an increase in life span.

Metabolism
Photoheterotrophs generate ATP using light, in one of two ways: they use a bacteriochlorophyll-based reaction center, or they use a bacteriorhodopsin. The chlorophyll-based mechanism is similar to that used in photosynthesis, where light excites the molecules in a reaction center and causes a flow of electrons through an electron transport chain (ETS). This flow of electrons through the proteins causes hydrogen ions to be pumped across a membrane. The energy stored in this proton gradient is used to drive ATP synthesis. Unlike in photoautotrophs, the electrons flow only in a cyclic pathway: electrons released from the reaction center flow through the ETS and return to the reaction center. They are not utilized to reduce any organic compounds. Purple non-sulfur bacteria, green non-sulfur bacteria, and heliobacteria are examples of bacteria that carry out this scheme of photoheterotrophy.

Other organisms, including halobacteria and flavobacteria and vibrios have purple-rhodopsin-based proton pumps that supplement their energy supply. The archaeal version is called bacteriorhodopsin, while the eubacterial version is called  proteorhodopsin. The pump consists of a single protein bound to a Vitamin A derivative, retinal. The pump may have accessory pigments (e.g., carotenoids) associated with the protein. When light is absorbed by the retinal molecule, the molecule isomerises. This drives the protein to change shape and pump a proton across the membrane. The hydrogen ion gradient can then be used to generate ATP, transport solutes across the membrane, or drive a flagellar motor. One particular flavobacterium cannot reduce carbon dioxide using light, but uses the energy from its rhodopsin system to fix carbon dioxide through anaplerotic fixation. The flavobacterium is still a heterotroph as it needs reduced carbon compounds to live and cannot subsist on only light and CO2. It cannot carry out reactions in the form of
n CO2 + 2n H2D + photons → (CH2O)n + 2n D + n H2O,
where H2D may be water, H2S or another compound/compounds providing the reducing electrons and protons; the 2D + H2O pair represents an oxidized form.

However, it can fix carbon in reactions like:
CO2 + pyruvate + ATP (from photons) → malate + ADP +Pi
where malate or other useful molecules are otherwise obtained by breaking down other compounds by
carbohydrate + O2 → malate + CO2 + energy.

This method of carbon fixation is useful when reduced carbon compounds are scarce and cannot be wasted as CO2 during interconversions, but energy is plentiful in the form of sunlight.

Flowchart

See also
Primary nutritional groups

References

Sources 

Biology terminology
Trophic ecology
Microbial growth and nutrition